The Nana-Barya Faunal Reserve is a protected area in the Central African Republic covering an area of  that was established in 1953.
Since 2005, it is considered a Lion Conservation Unit.

References

Protected areas of the Central African Republic
Faunal reserves